Building Bombs is a 1990 American documentary film produced and directed by Mark Mori and Susan J. Robinson.

Summary
It dealt with environmental contamination and worker safety issues at the Savannah River Site nuclear materials processing center in the United States state of South Carolina.

PBS
In 1993, Building Bombs: The Legacy was released on PBS' POV. This edited version was 10 minutes shorter than the original film.  Segments removed covered reasons for the nuclear buildup that were a subtext in the original release.

Accolades
It was nominated for an Academy Award for Best Documentary Feature.

References

External links

Building Bombs at POV

1990 films
1990 documentary films
American documentary films
Documentary films about nuclear war and weapons
Savannah River Site
1990s English-language films
1990s American films